The Director General of the Indian Coast Guard (DG ICG) is the head of the Indian Coast Guard. The DG ICG has their office in the Coast Guard Headquarters (CGHQ) in New Delhi. Appointed by the Government of India, the DG ICG reports to the Minister of Defence. The Director General is assisted by four Deputy Directors General, each holding the rank of inspector-general, and other senior officers heading various staff divisions. The Additional Director General of the ICG serves as the second-in-command to the Director General.

The post of Director General of the Indian Coast Guard is held by a three-star rank holder as a position and is not a rank in itself. It is equivalent to Vice Admiral of the Indian Navy, Lieutenant General of the Indian Army and the Air Marshal of the Indian Air Force. The rank of Additional Director General of the Indian Coast Guard is equivalent to that of a Lieutenant General of the Indian Army.

Virender Singh Pathania, is the current Director General of the Indian Coast Guard who assumed the office after Krishnaswamy Natarajan retired. The Flag officer is the third direct entry Coast Guard officer who took over the helm of the ICG on 31 December 2021 as the 24th Director General.

History
The Indian Coast Guard came into being on 19 August 1978. The new service was to function under the overall command and control of a Director general. Vice Admiral V. A. Kamath, deputed from the Indian Navy, served as the first DG ICG. Appointed on 19 August 1978, he served in the capacity until 31 March 1980. Until 2016, appointees to the DG position were Officers of the Indian Navy deputed to the Coast Guard.

Three direct entry Coast Guard officers have gone on to head the service. While two previous Directors General have come from the Coast Guard stream –Rameshwar Singh and P. Paleri – they have all initially been commissioned into the Indian Navy before later being permanently deputed to the Coast Guard service.

Additional responsibilities
Apart from heading the Coast Guard, the DGICG is also:
 Chairman, National Maritime Search and Rescue Board (NMSARB)
 Chairman, National Oil-spill Disaster Contingency Plan Committee (NOSDCP)
 Chairman, Offshore Security Co-ordination Committee (OSCC), of which the Flag Officer Defence Advisory Group is a member.
 Indian Governor to Regional Co-operation Agreement on Combating Piracy and Armed Robbery against ships in Asia (ReCAAP)

Insignia
The badges of rank have a crossed sword and baton over three eight-pointed stars and the Ashoka emblem above, on a golden shoulder board. The Director General wears gorget patches which are navy blue patches with three golden stars and oak leaves under the three golden stars. In addition to this, the double-breasted reefer jacket has three golden sleeve stripes consisting of a broad band with two narrower bands.

List of Directors General

Notes
Footnotes

References

Bibliography

External links
 Official website of Indian Coast Guard
 Organisational structure of Indian Coast Guard

Indian Coast Guard
Indian Navy
Indian military appointments